Non-denominated postage is postage intended to meet a certain postage rate that retains full validity for that intended postage rate even after the rate is increased. It does not show a monetary value, or denomination, on the face. In many English-speaking countries, it is called non-value indicator or non-value indicated (NVI) postage. Introduced to reduce the cost of printing large issues of low-value stamps to "top-up" old issues, NVI stamps are used in many countries.

UPU approval 
The Universal Postal Union approved the use of non-denominated stamps on international mail in 1995.

Canada 
Canada's first non-denominational stamp was the 1981 "A" Definitive, featuring a stylized maple leaf. It was issued during a transition from the first class domestic rate 17¢ to 30¢ and was valued at 30 cents. In 2006, Canada's next NVI was called the "Permanent" stamp, which is a trademarked term. It was originally marked by a white capital "P" overlaid on a red maple leaf, which is itself within a white circle. Later releases, such as the 2009 Silver Dart commemorative, varied the colours. In that example, the Maple Leaf around the "P" is white and the "P" is dropped out. The circle does not appear. In announcing its decision to adopt non-denominated postage in 2006, Canada Post noted that it had to print more than 60 million one-cent stamps following the last price increase in 2005. The Canadian NVI program was essentially equivalent to the American NVI program, as both covered regular domestic first-class mail. One Canada Post NVI stamp covers the cost of mailing a standard letter up to 30 g within Canada.

On 11 December 2013, Canada Post unveiled its Five-point Action Plan, which temporarily removed "Permanent" stamps from sale, although they remained valid for postage. On March 31, the regular domestic stamp price increased from CA$0.63 to CA$0.85 (roll & bundle issued stamps) and up to $1.00 for single stamp purchase, beginning on 31 March 2014. Sale of "Permanent" stamps resumed on that day at the new rate.

Czech Republic 
Czech stamps for domestic mail are marked "A", stamps for international mail to European countries are marked "E", and stamps for international mail to non-European countries are marked "Z".

India 

In 1940, the Government of United Province of British India issued a non-denominated stamp marking Literacy Day.

Republic of Ireland 
An Post issue "N" stamps at the current domestic posting rate, which allow posting throughout both the Republic of Ireland and Northern Ireland; and "W" stamps at the current international letter mail rate.

There were formerly "E" stamps for postage to within the European Union, but this postage rate has been discontinued.

All three values were introduced in 2000 prior to the Euro changeover; however, only "N" stamps were available for many years after that, and only by specific request at post offices; generally as special occasion stamps such as weddings or birthday celebration stamps which may be purchased significantly in advance of use. However, "N" and "W" stamps are now widely sold, and are the only commonly available pre-printed stamps sold.

The Netherlands 

PostNL now issues all first-class stamps as NVIs, which simply bear a large numeral “1” that varies to match the typography used for each particular issue. Stamps meeting the first-class rate to Europe additionally bore the marking “Europa”, and those to foreign destinations outside of Europe the marking “Wereld” (“World”); presently, all stamps for destinations outside the Netherlands are marked "Internationaal" ("international", with no distinctions for destinations within or outside Europe.

New Zealand 
New Zealand Post started issuing the Kiwistamp in 2009. One stamp will always be worth the required postage of a Standard Post medium domestic letter. Customers may use multiple Kiwistamps or mix them with denominated stamps to make up the required postage for bigger domestic or international mail.

Singapore 
Singapore has two NVIs today: 1st Local and 2nd Local. The first Singapore NVIs were issued in 1995; almost every issue had a "For Local Addresses Only" stamp. Later, in 2004, a new NVI denomination was released: "2nd Local". Since then almost all issues have "1st Local" stamps, and some have "2nd Local" stamps, rather than the previous "For Local Addresses Only". 1st Local stamps are valid for standard letters within Singapore up to 20 g, and 2nd Local stamps are valid for standard letters within Singapore up to 40 g.

Russia 
Russian Post sells envelopes and postcards with pre-printed non-denominated stamps for domestic mail, A for regular domestic mail, B for postcards, and D for registered mail.

Scandinavia

Åland 
Åland uses the following NVI denominations: Lokalpost (domestic, within Åland only), Inrikes (Finland), Europa (Europe), Världen (the world), 1 klass (1st class), 2 klass (2nd class), and Julpost (Christmas mail). The current values of non-denominated Åland postage stamps, or no-value indicator (NVI) is: Lokalpost (domestic, within Åland only): €0.75, Inrikes (Finland): €0.95, Europa (Europe): €0.95, Världen (the world): €1.00, 1 klass (1st class): €0.75, 2 klass (2nd class): €0.60 and Julpost (Christmas mail): €0.55.

Finland 
Finland's first NVI stamp (ikimerkki) was issued on 2.3.1992. There are two denominations, one valid for domestic 1st class, or overnight, domestic letter of up to 50 g and the other for similar 2nd class letter. The stamps may be combined for more expensive tariffs.

Norway 
Posten Norge launched these on 1 September 2005. They were first only used for domestic mail, later expanded to include Europe and World denominations.
They are called  (Value free stamps).

Sweden 
Sweden issues two forms of NVI valid for letters within Sweden of up to 50 g. These stamps may be combined when the weight of a letter exceeds 50 g. For up to 100 g – use two stamps; for up to 250 g – use 4 stamps; 500 g – 6 stamps; 1 kg – 8 stamps; 2 kg – 12 stamps. There are no longer surcharges to bulkier letters. The Swedish name for NVI stamps is "valörlösa frimärken".

Brev: first class delivery within Sweden. Brev ('letter') or Brev Inrikes ('domestic letter') is printed on the stamps. Price as of January 2020 - 11 SEK;
Julpost: first class delivery within Sweden. Julpost ('Christmas mail') is printed on the stamp. Price is 0.50 SEK lower than brev. Intended for use in a fixed period before Christmas.

NVI's that are no longer issued, but still valid for franking:
Ekonomibrev: used to be second class (up to three days for delivery) within Sweden. Price as of January 2009 - 5.50 SEK. The service does no longer exist.
Föreningsbrev: used to be rate for non-profit organizations. Price as of January 2009 - 5.00 SEK. The service does no longer exist.

Regular first class stamps can also be used to mail letters abroad, providing that their combined value corresponds to the appropriate rate by Swedish Post. For instance, to mail a letter up to 50 g in weight, two Brev stamps are required.

United Kingdom 

Non-denominated postage was first introduced in the United Kingdom in 1989 for domestic mail, in part as a workaround to the problem of fast-changing rates, the Royal Mail issuing "non-value indicated" Machins using textual inscriptions "1ST" and "2ND" to indicate class of service rather than a monetary value. It later introduced further stamps, including for worldwide and European use, for different weights, and for postcards.

United States

Letter-denominated stamps
In past years, non-denominated postage issued by the United States differed from the issues of other countries, in that the stamps retained their original monetary value. Some stamps, such as those intended for local or bulk mail rate, were issued without denomination.

This practice began in 1975, when there was uncertainty as to the timing and extent of a rate increase from ten cents for the first ounce of first-class postage as the end of the year approached. Christmas stamps were released without denomination, giving the United States Postal Service (USPS) flexibility to refrain from reprinting hundreds of millions of stamps in a new denomination. The rate increase, to thirteen cents (US$0.13), occurred just after Christmas.

The United States also issued stamps with letter denomination, beginning from A, B, etc., during postal rate changes. After reaching the letter "H", this practice was discarded in favor of simply indicating the class of postage (e.g., first class) for which the stamp was intended.

Forever stamps

In 2006, the USPS applied for permission to issue a first-class postage stamp similar to non-denominated stamps, termed the "Forever® stamp". The first such stamp was unveiled on March 26, 2007, and went on sale April 12, 2007, for 41 cents (US$0.41). Termed the "Liberty Bell" stamp, it was marked "USA FIRST-CLASS FOREVER". On October 21, 2010, the second Forever stamp, featuring pinecones on evergreen trees, was issued for the holiday season. Coils of Forever stamps were first issued on December 1, 2010, in the se-tenant format with Lady Liberty and the Flag design. A re-design, announced June 16, 2011, featured four American scientists: Melvin Calvin, Asa Gray, Maria Goeppert Mayer, and Severo Ochoa. In 2011, all first-class stamps were changed to Forever stamps.

Forever stamps are sold at the prevailing first-class postage rate and remain valid for full first-class postage, regardless of later rate increases. For example, the original Forever stamps purchased in April 2007 for 41 cents per stamp are still valid, even though there have been multiple rate increases since then.

While domestic Forever stamps can be used for international mail if additional postage is attached, the Global Forever stamp was introduced in early 2013 specifically for first-class international mail. In October of the same year, another Global Forever stamp with a Christmas motif was issued. Two new Global Forever stamps were issued the following year. All four were also printed in limited quantities without die cuts (imperforated) for collectors. Another Global Forever stamp, showing the Moon, followed in 2016, by which time only die cut stamps were printed. New Global Forever designs have been issued every year since 2017.

In 2015, Forever stamps were expanded to postcard, non-machinable surcharge, and additional ounce stamps. These stamps have their intended purpose printed on them instead of a number; this is similar to some fundraising (semi-postal) stamps, such as the breast cancer research stamp, issued in 1998.

Forever stamps are being increasingly targeted by scammers, who sell counterfeits online for substantial discounts over legitimate Forever stamps.

See also 
 Denomination (postage stamp)
 Make up stamp

References

Further reading
 Washington Post article on the forever stamp
 Official announcement of the US forever stamp proposal

External links

 Discussion of UK version.
 United States Postal Service guide to non-denominated postage stamps
 Non-denominated US stamps: Pictures and rates
 ForeverStamps.com Blog covering the Forever Stamp
 Slate.com, Nathaniel Rich: "Should I invest in 'Forever' Stamps?" Slate, May 17, 2007: Criticism of Forever Stamps as an investment

Philatelic terminology
Postal systems